The  is a  group kofun burial mounds located in what is now part of the town of Eiheiji, Fukui in the Hokuriku region of Japan. The site was designated a National Historic Site of Japan in 1977 in the case of the Tegurigajoyama Kofun, the  largest of the group. Protection was extended to the remainder of the group in July 2005.

Overview
The kofun group is located on a hillside with an elevation of 160 meters, overlooking the Kuzuryū River and the Echizen Plain. The cluster consists of about 150 tumuli, which are a mixture of square tumuli, circular tumuli, and keyhole-shaped tumuli. Among these tumuli, the four large keyhole-shape tumuli, (which are shaped like a keyhole, having one square end and one circular end, when viewed from above), which are estimated to date from the mid 4th to the late 5th century AD are covered under the National Historic Site designation. The tombs do not appear in any historical records and the name of rank of the persons buried within are unknown, although per local legend, these were the graves of the "Kings of Koshi" (越の国), the pre-Yamato dynasty state which controlled present-day Fukui, Ishikawa, Toyama and Niigata Prefectures. Emperor Keitai ((reigned 507 – 531 AD)) is said in some semi-legendary historical records to have originally been the King of Koshi, and therefore that the kofun in this area are the tombs for members of his clan.  

It is about a 20-minute walk from Shiizakai Station on the Echizen Railway Katsuyama Eiheiji Line to the Tegurigajoyama Kofun.

The kofun
 is the largest of the four tumuli, with a total length of 128.4 meters, making it is the second largest found in the Hokuriku region of Japan after the Rokuroseiyama Kofun. The circular portion is 78 meters in diameter and 19.7 meters high; the rectangular portion is in two tiers, with a length of 50.4 meters, width of 56.5 meters and a height of 15.2 meters. The tumulus is orientated to the northeast. It has a peculiar morphology in which the front part is extremely widened like a drumstick.  Large numbers of fukiishi and cylindrical haniwa were found in the area. The details of the interior are unknown as the kofun has not been excavated; however, ground-penetrating radar has confirmed that a stone-lined burial chamber exists near the apex of the posterior circle. The tumulus was dated to the middle of the fourth century AD.

 is the smallest of the four tumuli, with a total length of 53.7 meters; however, it was found to have a boat-shaped stone sarcophagus and two horizontal passage graves. A large number of grave goods were also uncovered, including stone spearheads, whetstones, fragments of iron implements, earthenware and horse fittings. The tumulus was partly carved out of the ground, and has no tiers. Haniwa have been found at the top of the posterior circle. It was dated to the middle of the fifth century.

 is also a keyhole-shaped tumulus, and has a total length of 79.1 meters, with a secondary tumulus on its southwest side. The main tumulus has two-tiers, and haniwa have been found. It also dates from the middle of the fifth century. It was robbed at some unknown time, and fragments of a boat-shaped stone sarcophagus were exposed, thus leading to its name.

 is a dome-shaped tumulus with a total length of 89 meters, although there is considerable controversy as to its structure, and prevalent option is that it is actually a keyhole-shaped tumulus which has partly collapsed. Neither [[fukiishi" nor haniwa have been found. It is built facing southwest on the summit of Nihonmatsuyama at an elevation of 273 meters on the south bank of the point where the Kuzuryu River enters the Fukui Plain. It was excavated in the Edo period (1716-1736) at which time records indicate that armor and human remains were found and reburied. However, when was extensively excavated in the Meiji period only a number of grave goods were recovered, including bronze mirrors, fragments of a crown, cylindrical beads, swords and other fragments of weapons and a boat-shaped sarcophagus, but no armor or bones. The tumulus dates to the late fifth century. According to legend, this tumulus is the grave of Furuhime, the mother of the semi-legendary Emperor Keitai.

See also
List of Historic Sites of Japan (Fukui)

References

External links

Cultural Heritage of Fukui Prefecture 
Eiheiji town guide 

Kofun
History of Fukui Prefecture
Eiheiji, Fukui
Historic Sites of Japan
Echizen Province